"Divorce"  (aṭ-talāq) is the 65th chapter of the Qur'an with 12 verses (ayat). At-Talaq is not only the name of this Surah but also the title of its subject matter, as it contains commandments about Talaq (divorce) itself. Abdullah ibn Masud (died c.653) reportedly described it as the shorter surah An-Nisa. The surah also defines the time period of  mourning (iddah) to be three menstruation periods.  For pre-menarche girls and for post-menopause women - three months.  In case of pregnancy, after the delivery of the child.

After addressing the topic of divorce and a number of other resulting family issues
in first 7 verses, the surah then strongly urges people to observe God’s regulations and guidance, and reminded the fate of earlier disobedient people that the apostate and disobedient were chastised for their sin. The 11th verse describes the required attitude of the true believers that they exhort to faith in messenger and the regarding bounties. Finally God’s power and knowledge are emphasized at the end.

Summary
1-7 Certain limitations to the law of divorce
8-10 The apostate and disobedient chastised for their sin
11 True believers exhorted to faith in Muhammad
12 God hath created the seven heavens

See also
 Divorce in Islam
 Iddah

References

External links 

Talaq
Divorce in Islam
Islam and women